Terrace Ridge is a mostly ice-free ridge, or spur, descending northwest from the summit area at the south end of Mount Schopf in the Ohio Range, Horlick Mountains, Antarctica. Resistant sandstone strata predominate in the lower half of the slope of the ridge, forming a series of partly ice-covered terraces separated by scarps. The descriptive name was suggested by geologists of the Ohio State University expedition who worked in these mountains in the 1960-61 and 1961-62 seasons.

Ridges of Marie Byrd Land